La Niña is an oceanic and atmospheric phenomenon that is the colder counterpart of  as part of the broader El Niño–Southern Oscillation (ENSO) climate pattern. The name La Niña originates from Spanish for "the girl", by analogy to El Niño, meaning "the boy". In the past, it was also called an anti-El Niño and El Viejo, meaning "the old man."

During a La Niña period, the sea surface temperature across the eastern equatorial part of the central Pacific Ocean will be lower than normal by 3–5 °C (5.4–9 °F). An appearance of La Niña often persists for longer than five months. El Niño and La Niña can be indicators of weather changes across the globe. Atlantic and Pacific hurricanes can have different characteristics due to lower or higher wind shear and cooler or warmer sea surface temperatures.

Background
A timeline of all La Niña episodes between 1900 and 2023.

La Niña is a complex weather pattern that occurs every few years, as a result of variations in ocean temperatures in the equatorial band of the Pacific Ocean, The phenomenon occurs as strong winds blow warm water at the ocean's surface away from South America, across the Pacific Ocean towards Indonesia. As this warm water moves west, cold water from the deep sea rises to the surface near South America; it is considered to be the cold phase of the broader El Niño–Southern Oscillation (ENSO) weather phenomenon, as well as the opposite of  weather pattern. The movement of so much heat across a quarter of the planet, and particularly in the form of temperature at the ocean surface, can have a significant effect on weather across the entire planet.

Tropical instability waves visible on sea surface temperature maps, showing a tongue of colder water, are often present during neutral or La Niña conditions.

La Niña events have occurred for hundreds of years, and occurred on a regular basis during the early parts of both the 17th and 19th centuries. Since the start of the 20th century, La Niña events have occurred during the following years:

Impacts on the global climate

La Niña impacts the global climate and disrupts normal weather patterns, which can lead to intense storms in some places and droughts in others.

Regional impacts
Observations of La Niña events since 1950 show that impacts associated with La Niña events depend on what season it is. However, while certain events and impacts are expected to occur during these periods, it is not certain or guaranteed that they will occur.

Africa

La Niña results in wetter-than-normal conditions in southern Africa from December to February, and drier-than-normal conditions over equatorial east Africa over the same period.

Asia
During La Niña years, the formation of tropical cyclones, along with the subtropical ridge position, shifts westward across the western Pacific Ocean, which increases the landfall threat in China. It also caused heavy rains over Malaysia, the Philippines, and Indonesia.

Australia

Across most of the continent, El Niño and La Niña have more impact on climate variability than any other factor. There is a strong correlation between the strength of La Niña and rainfall: the greater the sea surface temperature and Southern Oscillation difference from normal, the larger the rainfall change.

North America

La Niña causes mostly the opposite effects of El Niño: above-average precipitation across the northern Midwest, the northern Rockies, Northern California, and the Pacific Northwest's southern and eastern regions. Meanwhile, precipitation in the southwestern and southeastern states, as well as southern California, is below average. This also allows for the development of many stronger-than-average hurricanes in the Atlantic and fewer in the Pacific.

The synoptic condition for Tehuantepecer winds is associated with high-pressure system forming in Sierra Madre of Mexico in the wake of an advancing cold front, which causes winds to accelerate through the Isthmus of Tehuantepec. Tehuantepecers primarily occur during the cold season months for the region in the wake of cold fronts, between October and February, with a summer maximum in July caused by the westward extension of the Azores–Bermuda high pressure system. Wind magnitude is weaker during La Niña years than  years, due to the less frequent cold frontal incursions during La Niña winters, with its effects can last from a few hours to six days. Between 1942 and 1957, La Niña had an impact that caused isotope changes in the plants of Baja California.

In Canada, La Niña will, in general, cause a cooler, snowier winter, such as the near-record-breaking amounts of snow recorded in the La Niña winter of 2007–2008 in eastern Canada.

In the spring of 2022, La Niña caused above-average precipitation and below-average temperatures in the state of Oregon. April was one of the wettest months on record, and La Niña effects, while less severe, were expected to continue into the summer.

South America
During a time of La Niña, drought plagues the coastal regions of Peru and Chile. From December to February, northern Brazil is wetter than normal. La Niña causes higher than normal rainfall in the central Andes, which in turn causes catastrophic flooding on the Llanos de Mojos of Beni Department, Bolivia. Such flooding is documented from 1853, 1865, 1872, 1873, 1886, 1895, 1896, 1907, 1921, 1928, 1929 and 1931.

Diversity 

The ‘traditional’ or conventional La Niña is called an Eastern Pacific (EP) La Niña; it involves temperature anomalies in the eastern Pacific. However, aside from differences in diagnostic criteria, non-traditional La Niñas were observed in the last two decades, in which the usual place of the temperature anomaly (Niño 1 and 2) is not affected, but rather an anomaly arises in the central Pacific (Niño 3.4). The phenomenon is called Central Pacific (CP) La Niña, dateline La Niña (because the anomaly arises near the dateline), or La Niña "Modoki" ("Modoki" is Japanese for "alternate / meta / similar-but-different"). These "flavors" of ENSO are in addition to EP and CP types, leading some scientists argue that ENSO is a continuum of phenomena – often with hybrid types.

The effects of the CP La Niña similarly contrast with the EP La Niña – it strongly tends to increase rainfall over northwestern Australia and northern Murray–Darling basin, rather than over the east as in a conventional La Niña. Also, La Niña Modoki increases the frequency of cyclonic storms over Bay of Bengal, but decreases the occurrence of severe storms in the Indian Ocean overall, with the Arabian Sea becoming severely non-conducive to tropical cyclone formation.

Recent years when La Niña Modoki events occurred include 1973–1974, 1975–1976, 1983–1984, 1988–1989, 1998–1999, 2000–2001, 2008–2009, 2010–2011, and 2016–2017.

The recent discovery of ENSO Modoki has some scientists believing it to be linked to global warming. However, comprehensive satellite data go back only to 1979. Generally, there is no scientific consensus on how or if climate change may affect ENSO.

There is also a scientific debate on the very existence of this "new" ENSO. A number of studies dispute the reality of this statistical distinction or its increasing occurrence, or both, either arguing the reliable record is too short to detect such a distinction, finding no distinction or trend using other statistical approaches, or that other types should be distinguished, such as standard and extreme ENSO.

See also 
 2000 Mozambique flood (attributed to La Niña)
 2010 Pakistan floods (attributed to La Niña)
 2010–2011 Queensland floods (attributed to La Niña)
 2010–2012 La Niña event
 2010–2011 Southern Africa floods (attributed to La Niña)
 2010–2013 Southern United States and Mexico drought (attributed to La Niña)
 2011 East Africa drought (attributed to La Niña)
 2020 Atlantic hurricane season (unprecedented severity fueled by La Niña)
 2021 New South Wales floods (severity fueled by La Niña)
 March 2022 Suriname flooding (attributed to La Niña)
 2023 North Island floods (attributed to La Niña)
 Ocean dynamical thermostat
 Walker circulation

Footnotes

References

External links 
 
 
 

Regional climate effects
Tropical meteorology
Physical oceanography
Weather hazards
Pacific Ocean
Spanish words and phrases